Michigan State University Federal Credit Union (MSUFCU) is an American credit union headquartered in East Lansing, Michigan. Primarily serving students and alumni of Michigan State University and Oakland University, MSUFCU is the largest university-based credit union in the world, and is federally chartered and regulated under the National Credit Union Administration (NCUA). MSUFCU provides a variety of financial products and services including deposit accounts, personal and business loans, investments, and insurance, among others. MSUFCU is owned by its members, which elect a board of directors to oversee its operations. As of year-end 2020, MSUFCU has 21 branches, over 300,000 members, more than $5.6 billion in assets, and nearly 900 employees.

History
In 1937, Michigan State College of Agriculture and Applied Science (MSCAAS) faculty and staff members founded the state-chartered Michigan State College Employees Credit Union (MSCECU). Being a state-charted credit union means it fell under the regulatory authority of Michigan’s division of financial services. The Credit Union was created with a mere $3,000 in assets, a desk drawer to operate out of at MSCAAS’s administration building, and a singular goal: to help members achieve their dreams.

In 1955, the State of Michigan renamed Michigan State College as Michigan State University, and MSCECU adjusted its name to become Michigan State Employees Credit Union. The Credit Union moved to the Power House Plant on MSU's campus the following year.

To better serve members who lived near MSU’s satellite campus in Oakland County, another Credit Union branch was opened there in 1967.

In 1971, the Credit Union relocated its main office across MSU’s campus in East Lansing, Michigan from the Power House Plant to 600 E Crescent Road, as its membership and assets continued to increase.

A branch in Auburn Hills, Michigan was opened in 1973.

The Credit Union was state chartered until 1978 when the NCUA approved the Credit Union's application for federal charter, effectively changing its name to MSU Federal Credit Union. By that time, MSUFCU had grown to $40 million in assets and 29,244 members.

In 1983, MSUFCU’s Okemos branch was added. This branch was relocated to its current location on Central Park Drive in 2003. The East Lansing branch was constructed on East Grand River Ave across from MSU’s campus in 1987. The Credit Union continued to grow in the early 2000s with the West Side Lansing branch opening in 2003, the South Lansing branch in 2005, and the MSU Union branch on MSU's campus in 2006.

MSUFCU continued to expand by opening a new headquarters building at 3777 West Road in East Lansing in 2008. The building was constructed using green building standards and received a gold Leadership in Energy and Environmental Design (LEED) certification.

In April 2011, MSUFCU expanded into downtown Lansing with a new branch located on Washington Avenue, a convenient location for the many workers of downtown Lansing, including State of Michigan employees. In March 2012, the third MSU campus branch opened on Mount Hope Road and in September of the same year, another branch was opened on Marsh Road in Haslett, Michigan. To help better serve Sparrow Hospital employees, patients, and visitors, an MSUFCU branch was opened within the Lansing Sparrow Hospital Professional Building in January 2013.

Effective April 2013, MSUFCU merged with former Eaton County Educational Credit Union (ECECU). MSUFCU acquired one branch location in Charlotte, Michigan, from the merger.

In May 2014, construction began on MSUFCU's Meridian Crossing branch, which is located on Jolly Road in Okemos, Michigan. And in September 2014, MSUFCU opened a branch in Mason.

In November 2014, the Credit Union announced a new $46 million, 186,350 square-foot building expansion to the existing headquarters campus. The second headquarters building houses a call center, information technology department, and other member service departments. The second building on MSUFCU’s headquarters campus celebrated its grand opening in October 2017, coinciding with MSUFCU’S 80th anniversary.

In March 2015, after 41 years of service with the organization, Patrick McPharlin retired as President/CEO of MSUFCU. April Clobes became the Credit Union’s next and current President/CEO. Throughout her 18-year tenure with the Credit Union, April held titles such as Vice President of Marketing and eCommerce, Executive Vice President, and Chief Operating Officer, among other roles prior to becoming President/CEO.

In April 2016, MSUFCU merged with Clarkston Brandon Community Credit Union (CBCCU), headquartered in Clarkston, Michigan, which allowed MSUFCU to add five southeast Michigan counties (Oakland, Genesee, Lapeer, Livingston, and Macomb) to its field of membership. Along with the merger, two more Oakland County branches were acquired: Clarkston and Ortonville.

A branch in downtown Grand Rapids opened in fall 2017, allowing the Credit Union to expand westward.

MSUFCU opened a branch in Holt, Michigan, and relocated its existing Clarkston branch on Ortonville Road to a new location on Sashabaw Road in 2020.  MSUFCU also opened one location in Traverse City, and is currently building another one with a planned opening in 2021. The Credit Union will open a regional office in Auburn Hills in 2021 as well.

Throughout the years, MSUFCU has grown sizably but its values remain the same: helping members and employees achieve their goals and dreams; volunteering with and donating to charitable organizations in the communities it serves; offering financial education; and providing superior service.

In 2017, MSUFCU announced a $5.5 million donation to MSU to support ten university programs over the course of five years. Each year, $1.1 million would be donated to support the Broad Art Museum, College of Arts and Letters, College of Business, College of Communications Arts and Sciences, College of Music, College of Social Science, Residential College in Arts and Humanities, Science Gallery, Wharton Center, and WKAR.

Oakland University Credit Union (OU Credit Union)
MSUFCU began its partnership with Oakland University in the late 1950s after Alfred and Matilda Wilson donated $2 million and their 1,500-acre estate to Michigan State University to start a new college in Oakland County. MSUFCU provided financial services to the university employees at that time and continued to serve the OU community after Oakland University became its own entity.

In January 2014, MSUFCU strengthened its partnership with OU by becoming the official credit union for the university under the trade-name of Oakland University Credit Union (OU Credit Union). To enhance the OU community’s experience with the Credit Union, a branch was opened in Oakland University’s Oakland Center to serve OU students, faculty, staff, and community members on campus and campus ATMs were converted to OU Credit Union ATMs.

Recognitions
MSUFCU has a national reputation for excellence and has received several top industry and workplace awards, including being named as a Top Workplace in the large employer category by the Detroit Free Press for eight consecutive years, a Top 100 Best Workplace for Women by Fortune for three consecutive years, and is in the top five Michigan credit unions by Forbes Best-in-State Credit Unions. MSUFCU was named a Best Workplace in Financial Services and Insurance by Fortune Magazine two consecutive years, and has been certified as a Great Place to Work for seven consecutive years. MSUFCU has also been recognized by the Credit Union National Association, recently winning first place for the people-helping-people philosophy 2020 Louise Herring Award.

References

External links
Official website
Branch Locations
National Credit Union Administration's CU Online tool—provides many financial and organizational details

Banks established in 1937
Credit unions based in Michigan
Michigan State University
Economy of Lansing, Michigan
1937 establishments in Michigan
East Lansing, Michigan